Journey Together is a 1945 British drama war film directed by John Boulting and starring Richard Attenborough, Jack Watling and David Tomlinson. It is Boulting's film directorial debut. The film was produced by the Royal Air Force Film Production Unit. Noted dramatist Terence Rattigan, then a Royal Air Force Flight Lieutenant, was posted in 1943 to the RAF Film Production Unit to work on The Way to the Stars and Journey Together.

Top-billed Edward G. Robinson plays a large supporting role as an instructor for the fledgling pilots and second-billed silent film star Bessie Love portrays his wife. In the story, two Englishmen become friends while serving with the Royal Air Force, ending with a bombing raid on Berlin. The plot emphasises the importance of team work in a bomber crew and the important role of the navigator.

Plot 
Two RAF aircrew cadets, David Wilton and John Aynesworth, become friends. A friendly rivalry develops between the two when they both enter pilot training and it ends in a bet over who will become the better pilot. They pass their initial training and are sent to the United States for more advanced instruction. Once there, it becomes clear that Wilton, while he is otherwise a good pilot, cannot land a plane properly. Wilton is devastated and the feeling worsens when he sees that Aynesworth is a natural pilot. While Aynesworth proceeds with his pilot's training, Wilton is sent to Canada to be trained as a navigator instead.

Wilton turns out to be a good navigator but he shows no enthusiasm for his training. Then, on a practice flight, the pilot, who is also one of the instructors and is aware of his attitude, secretly simulates an emergency situation to show Wilton the importance of the role of the navigator. After graduating, Wilton is posted to a squadron in Britain but his reputation has followed him. Eventually, he replaces an injured navigator on Aynesworth's flight crew on a bombing operation but their welcome is lukewarm. As they complete the bombing mission, the plane is hit and begins to lose fuel; when they have to ditch in the North Sea, Wilton must demonstrate everything he has learned and quickly communicate their position to base. It turns out that he has perfectly calculated their position and the rescue plane easily finds them. The crew decide they'd like to keep him.

Cast

Production 
The opening credits state that the film was "Written, Produced, Directed, Photographed, and Acted by members of the Royal Air Force". The closing cast list also includes other Allied services personnel.

Richard Attenborough, the picture's lead, was 22 years old at the time of filming.

Reception 
According to Kinematograph Weekly, the film performed well at the British box office in 1945.

References

External links 
 
 
 
 
 Journey Together at BritMovie.co.uk
 Review of film at Variety

1945 films
1940s war drama films
1940s English-language films
Films directed by John Boulting
British war drama films
British aviation films
British black-and-white films
1945 drama films
1940s British films